Glenn Dennis (March 24, 1925 – April 28, 2015) was a founder of the International UFO Museum and Research Center in Roswell, New Mexico, which opened in September 1991, and self-professed witness to the 1947 Roswell UFO incident.

Early life
Dennis began working as a part-time assistant in the Ballard Funeral Home in 1940 while still attending Roswell High School. After graduation, Dennis was excused from wartime military service because of poor hearing, and commenced an apprenticeship as an embalmer at Ballard.  He graduated from the San Francisco College of Mortuary Science on 22 December 1946 and was put in charge of Ballard's military contract, which included ambulance and mortuary services for the nearby Roswell Army Air Field (RAAF), renamed Walker Air Force Base in 1948.

Roswell incident
Dennis came to the attention of UFO researchers in 1994 when he called the hotline after an episode of Unsolved Mysteries featured the Roswell UFO incident. He was the first witness to confirm claims of alien bodies at the Roswell base itself.

Analysis of testimony
Dennis’ accounts featured prominently in Crash at Corona published in 1992 and The Truth About the UFO Crash at Roswell, published in 1994, as well other pro-UFO books, but serious doubts about his story were soon raised. 

Dennis's account is repeated in Witness to Roswell: Unmasking the 60-Year Cover-Up by Thomas Carey and Donald Schmitt, published in 2007. Regarding Dennis providing researchers with a false name, they write, "His surprising and disappointing response was,... 'I gave you a phony name, because I promised her that I would never reveal it to anyone'." The authors then comment that "Dennis was found to have knowingly provided false information to investigators, and must technically stand impeached as a witness." However, the book also notes that other witnesses "have told us that Dennis had told them about the phone calls for child-sized caskets way back when it happened" and that "Dennis had told them about his run-in at the base hospital long before Roswell became a household word."

References

Further reading
 Thomas J. Carey and Donald R. Schmitt, Witness to Roswell, 2007, New Page Books, 
Stanton T. Friedman and Don Berliner, ‘’Crash at Corona’’, 1992, Marlowe and Co., 
Kevin Randle and Donald R. Schmitt, ‘’The Truth About the UFO Crash at Roswell’’, 1994, Avon Books, 
 Tim Shawcross, The Roswell Files, 1997, Motorbook International, 
Alan Baker, "The Encyclopedia of Alien Encounters", 2000, Facts on File, Inc

External links 
 
 International UFO Museum & Research Center Website
 The Tales of Glenn Dennis
 Dennis’ affidavit, drawing, other affidavits, discussion of other witness testimony on bodies & nurse
 Transcript: CNN LARRY KING LIVE Do UFOs Exist?
 W. Glenn Davis Interview, 11/19/1990, 41-minute interview. His name is corrected as DENNIS at Reddit, accessed 12/10/2020. 

Roswell incident
Ufologists
UFO-related phenomena
2015 deaths
1925 births
People from Abilene, Texas
People from Roswell, New Mexico